The Presbyterian Church in Korea (HapDongBoSu III.) was a result of the split of the HapDongBoSu group, due to the heresy trial of Rev. Park Yun-Sik of the Presbyterian Church in Korea (Daeshin). It adheres to the Apostles Creed and Westminster Confession. In 2004 it had almost 200,000 members in 807 congregations and more than 1243 ordained ministers.

References 

Presbyterian denominations in South Korea
Presbyterian denominations in Asia